Crossland High School is a public secondary school located in Camp Springs census-designated place, unincorporated Prince George's County, Maryland, with Temple Hills postal address. The school serves about 2,000 students in grades 9 to 12 in the Prince George's County Public Schools system.

Crossland is named after a prominent early Maryland family.

The vocational wing was dedicated by President Lyndon Baines Johnson in 1967.

Crossland serves: much of Camp Springs CDP, all of Temple Hill CDP, and portions of Hillcrest Heights, Marlow Heights, Oxon Hill, and Silver Hill CDPs.

In popular culture

The high school in the Diary of a Wimpy Kid series is named Crossland High School.

Notable alumni

 Jess Atkinson, Class of 1980, placekicker for the University of Maryland and Washington Redskins
 Peter Bergman, daytime television actor, currently plays Jack on CBS' The Young and the Restless; class of 1971
 Mark Davis, Dallas radio talk show host and newspaper columnist; class of 1975
 Pierre Edwards (born May 7, 1967) known as Pierre, is an American actor, director, writer, and stand-up comedian. Pierre is best known for producing, writing, directing, and starring as Dre Mitchell in For Da Love of Money (2002),[1] and starring in such films as 2001: A Space Travesty (2000), Def Jam's How to Be a Player (1997), and B*A*P*S (1997).[2]
 Michael A. Jackson, Maryland State Senator
 Stephen Tyrone Johns, security officer who died in the line of duty in the 2009 Holocaust Memorial Museum shooting
 Kevin Merida, Executive editor, Los Angeles Times
 Julian Peterson, NFL football player
 Tank, R&B singer
 Walt "The Wizard" Williams, NBA basketball player

References

External links

 Crossland High School
 

Public high schools in Maryland
International Baccalaureate schools in Maryland
Schools in Prince George's County, Maryland